Lukáš Latinák (born February 28, 1977) is a Slovak film, television and stage actor. He is a recipient of three OTO Awards in the main categories.

Selected filmography
 Kruté radosti (2002)
  (2002)
 Walking Too Fast (2010)
 Identity Card (2010)
  (2014)
 Doktor Martin (television, 2015)
 Rex (television, 2017)

Awards

References
General

Specific

External links 
 Lukáš Latinák at IMDb
 Lukáš Latinák at KinoBox

1977 births
Living people
People from Brezno
Slovak male film actors
Slovak male television actors